The Somerset Railroad was built to serve Kennebec River communities and later extended through timberlands to a large wooden Victorian era destination hotel on Moosehead Lake.  The railway became part of the Maine Central Railroad in 1911; and a portion remained  in intermittent operation by Pan Am Railways until 2013.

History
Somerset Railroad was chartered in 1860 to build north along the Kennebec River from the Maine Central Railroad "back road" at Oakland, Maine.  The line originally shared the Maine Central Portland gauge of 5 ft 6 in (1,676 mm).  Construction reached Norridgewock in 1873, Madison in 1875, and North Anson in 1877.  The company defaulted in 1879 and was reorganized as the standard gauge Somerset Railway in 1884 before construction continued to Solon in 1889 and Bingham in 1890. The reorganized company extended the line to Moosehead Lake in 1906 and built a large resort hotel called the Mount Kineo House.  The railroad had fifteen plush upholstered coaches, nine baggage cars, and twelve combination smoking-baggage cars with leather seats in the smoking section.  Hotel patrons arrived on through Pullman cars from large eastern cities, and reached the hotel by steamboat from the railroad terminal at Kineo Station.  Maine Central railroad purchased the Mount Kineo House with the Somerset Railway; and the railway became the Kineo branch of the Maine Central Railroad in 1911.  Aboriginal forests had been converted to lumber and pulpwood before the last passenger train over the branch ran in September, 1933; and the line north of Bingham was dismantled that year.  The Mount Kineo House was razed in 1938.

Mount Kineo was not the only destination sought by passengers on the Old Somerset Railroad. Many prominent figures of the time, such as Theodore Roosevelt and Henry David Thoreau, ventured to Maine's Somerset County in search of wilderness. Lake Moxie Station became the jumping off point for sporting camps and remote destinations north along the current U.S. Route 201 all the way up to The Forks, Lake Parlin, and Upper Enchanted Township.

Bingham became an important loading point for pulpwood floated down the Kennebec River to Wyman Dam until environmental regulations curtailed log driving in the 1970s.  The former Madison Paper Industries paper mill at Madison was the last major customer on the branch originating or terminating 3,000 annual carloads in 1973. A portion of the line from Oakland to Madison remained in operation by Pan Am Railways until service was ended in 2013. Access to the remaining section of line from Madison to Embden is gated off at the former Madison Paper Industries mill. Track from Embden to Bingham has been removed but the roadbed remains in use as a rail trail. On June 24th, 2021, Pan Am Railways had filed with the Surface Transportation Board to formally abandon the remaining section of line from Oakland to Madison and Embden. On November 30th, 2021, The State of Maine announced the acquisition of a 32 mile section of the former rail line from Oakland north to Embden for conversion into a multi-use rail trail.

As of July 2022, all remaining track and ties have been removed with the exception of grade crossings covered by asphalt and the bridges.

Railway mileposts

 Milepost 0: Oakland on the Maine Central Back Road; location of railroad shops
 Milepost 13: Norridgewock
 Milepost 20.9: Madison paper mill
 Milepost 21.3: Anson
 Milepost 25.3: North Anson
 Milepost 30.4: Embden
 Milepost 33.9: Solon pulp mill, potato house, and corn cannery
 Milepost 41: Bingham
 Milepost 48.2: Deadwater sawmill
 Milepost 52.2: Bald Mountain logging branch
 Milepost 60.1: Mosquito
 Milepost 64.7: Lake Moxie sawmill
 Milepost 85.3: Somerset Junction (with the Canadian Pacific Railway International of Maine Division)
 Milepost 91.5: Kineo Station

Early locomotives

References

Defunct Maine railroads
Pan Am Railways
Predecessors of the Maine Central Railroad
Kennebec River
Transportation in Kennebec County, Maine
Transportation in Piscataquis County, Maine
Railway companies established in 1873
Railway companies disestablished in 1911
1870s establishments in Maine
1911 disestablishments in Maine